Kerstin Gerschau (later Kurrat, born 26 January 1958) is a retired German gymnast. She competed at the 1976 Summer Olympics in all artistic gymnastics events and won a bronze medal in the team competition. Her best individual result was seventh place on uneven bars. She won a silver on the floor and a bronze all-around at the 1973 European championships.

Her father Helmut was a national gymnastics coach. After retiring from competitions, she studied choreography at the Theater Academy in Leipzig and received a degree in physical education from the German College of Physical Education. In 1978, she married Klaus-Dieter Kurrat, a German sprinter who also competed at the 1976 Olympics; they have three children. Since 1990 she runs her dance studio in Teltow.

References

1958 births
Sportspeople from Leipzig
Living people
German female artistic gymnasts
Olympic gymnasts of East Germany
Gymnasts at the 1976 Summer Olympics
Olympic bronze medalists for East Germany
Olympic medalists in gymnastics
Medalists at the 1976 Summer Olympics